This article lists events from the year 2015 in Bhutan.

Incumbents
 Monarch: Jigme Khesar Namgyel Wangchuck
 Prime Minister: Tshering Tobgay

Events
25 April - Nepal earthquake

Deaths

References

Links

 
Bhutan
Bhutan
2010s in Bhutan
Years of the 21st century in Bhutan